Sauzon is a commune on the island of Belle Île in the Morbihan department of the region of Brittany in north-western France. Inhabitants of Sauzon are called Sauzonnais.

Geography

Sauzon is one of the four communes of Belle-île en Mer. The town occupies the northwestern part of the island.

Map

Personalities linked to the commune 
 Sarah Bernhardt, the actress, was captivated by the natural beauty of the Pointe des Poulains at the extreme northwest of the island and stayed here regularly from 1894. Around the closed fort, she built several villas (villa Lysiane, villa des Cinq Parties du Monde) and arranged the surrounding grounds as a set of gardens integrated into the natural scenery of the place. The site was acquired by the Conservatoire du littoral and since April 2007 has been a museum dedicated to Bernhardt and the story of the preservation of the site.
 Philippe de Broca, the film director, is buried here.

See also
Communes of the Morbihan department

References

External links
Official website 
Photos and info on Sauzon 

 Mayors of Morbihan Association 

Communes of Morbihan
Populated coastal places in Brittany